The Midouze, is a right tributary of the Adour river, in the Landes, in the Southwest of France.

Name 
The name Midouze is a portmanteau that fuses the names of the two precursors of the river, the Midou and the Douze.

Geography 
The Midouze is the union of the Midou (or Midour) and the Douze. These two rivers rise in the Gers département (in the historical region of Armagnac) and join in Mont-de-Marsan.

Départements and towns 

 Landes : Mont-de-Marsan, Tartas

Main tributaries 
 (R) Estrigon, from Labrit.
 (R) Bez, from Morcenx.

References

Rivers of France
Rivers of Landes (department)
Rivers of Nouvelle-Aquitaine